Oleksiivska is a station on Kharkiv Metro's Oleksiivska Line. The station opened on 21 December 2010. It was the terminus of the Oleksiivska Line until the Peremoha station was opened on 19 August 2016.

The station was on the drawing board since 1992. Projected opening years of the station were 2005, 2006, 2008 and 2009.

References

External links
 Gortransport Kharkiv - Alekseevskaya Station

Kharkiv Metro stations
Railway stations opened in 2010